Josef Klose (born 3 October 1947) is a former Polish footballer. He is the father of former German national striker and 2014 World Cup winner Miroslav Klose.

Josef Klose began his career at Energetyk Sławięcice. From 1966 he was a forward for Odra Opole, winning the 1977 Polish League Cup and subsequently playing in the 1977–78 UEFA Cup. In November 1978, the year his son was born, he joined French side AJ Auxerre in Ligue 2. He helped them reach the 1979 Coupe de France final and win promotion in 1980 to Ligue 1, where he played 14 games, scoring twice. From 1981 to 1984, while already in his mid-thirties, he played for fourth league side FC Chalon.

He is married to Barbara Jeż, a former member of the Poland women's national handball team.

His family, of Silesian-German ancestry, had been German citizens in the Province of Upper Silesia (until 1945) and thus could resettle in West Germany as Aussiedler, which they did in 1985, settling down in Kusel.

References

External links
 Profile on AJ Auxerre official site
 Career

1947 births
Living people
People from Kędzierzyn-Koźle
Sportspeople from Opole Voivodeship
Polish footballers
German footballers
Polish emigrants to Germany
Polish people of German descent
Silesian-German people
AJ Auxerre players
Odra Opole players
Ligue 2 players
Polish expatriate footballers
Expatriate footballers in France
FC Chalon players
Association football forwards